Calothamnus borealis is a plant in the myrtle family, Myrtaceae and is endemic to the south-west of Western Australia. It is a small, erect shrub with crowded, cylindrical leaves and red flowers. It grows in sand surrounded by spinifex or heath. In 2014 Craven, Edwards and Cowley proposed that the species be renamed Melaleuca aquilonia.

Description
They are covered with short hairs giving a greyish tinge.

The flowers are red and are arranged in small clusters containing 1 to 12 individual flowers, mostly hidden among the leaves. The stamens are arranged in 5 claw-like bundles with 20 to 25 stamens per bundle.

Taxonomy and naming
Calothamnus borealis was first formally described in 1984 by Trevor Hawkeswood from a specimen found near Exmouth. The specific epithet (borealis) is derived from the Latin, meaning "north" or "northern" and refers to the fact that this species has the most northerly distribution of any of the Calothamnus species.

Distribution and habitat
Calothamnus borealis occurs from the Exmouth area south to Coral Bay, with a disjunct population in the Kennedy Range. Its range is within the Carnarvon biogeographic region. It grows in sand dunes in heath or spinifex grassland.

Conservation
This species is classified as "not threatened" by the Western Australian government department of parks and wildlife.

References

borealis
Myrtales of Australia
Plants described in 1984
Endemic flora of Western Australia